My Brother Is a Dog is a 2004 film directed by Peter Timm and starring Maria Ehrich, Martin Lindow and Christine Neubauer.

Cast 
 Maria Ehrich as Marietta
 Irm Hermann as Oma Gerda
 Christine Neubauer as Mutter Maria
 Martin Lindow as Vater Martin
 Hans-Laurin Beyerling as Tobias
 Ellen ten Damme as Ica Müller
 Gary Lewis as Antiquitätenhändler
 Julia Ferch as Lisa
 Kai Ivo Baulitz as Regie-Assistant
 Renate Hiltl as Süßwaren-Verkäuferin
 Karsten Blumenthal as Fahrer
 Peter Schneider as Fahrer
 Moritz Führmann as Maler 
 Arved Birnbaum as Maler
 Thomas Bieberstein as Hundeverkäufer
 Christof Wackernagel as Projektleiter
 Aurel Manthei as Security-Man
 Norbert Heisterkamp as Wachmann
 Michael Günther as Wachmann 
 Hans Timo Beyerling as Junge
 Nikolai Mohr as Junge 
 Komi Togbonou as Medizinmann
 Thomas Gimbel as Polizist
 Ingolf Lück as Regisseur
 Brigitte Janner as Kundin
 Gustl vom Hause Holzhauer as Toby the dog

Awards
Biberach Film Festival
 In 2004, My Brother is a Dog won the ‘Honorable Mention’ for Peter Timm. 
Chicago International Children's Film Festival 
 In 2005, My Brother is a Dog won the ‘Best of the Fest’ for Peter Timm. 
Oulu International Children's Film Festival
 Peter Timm was nominated for the ‘Starboy Award’ in 2004. 
Undine Awards, Austria
 My Brother is a Dog was nominated for the ‘Undine Award’ for ‘best Debut, Female – Film’ for Maria Ehrich.

References

External links

http://www.german-films.de/app/filmarchive/film_view.php?film_id=1188
http://www.allesfilm.com/show_article.php?id=21275
http://www.moviemaster.de/archiv/film/film_3548.htm

2004 films
German fantasy films
German children's films
2000s German films